Thiomargarita namibiensis is a Gram-negative coccoid bacterium, found in the ocean sediments of the continental shelf of Namibia. It is the second largest bacterium ever discovered, as a rule  in diameter, but sometimes attaining . Cells of Thiomargarita namibiensis are large enough to be visible to the naked eye. Although the species held the record for the largest known bacterium, Epulopiscium fishelsoni – previously discovered in the gut of surgeonfish – grows slightly longer, but narrower.

Thiomargarita means "sulfur pearl". This refers to the appearance of the cells; they contain microscopic sulfur granules that scatter incident light, lending the cell a pearly lustre. Like many coccoid bacteria such as Streptococcus, their cellular division tends to occur along a single axis, causing their cells to form chains, rather like strings of pearls. The species name namibiensis means "of Namibia".

Occurrence 
The species was discovered by Heide N. Schulz and others in 1997, in the coastal seafloor sediments of Walvis Bay (Namibia). Schulz and her colleagues, from the Max Planck Institute for Marine Microbiology, were on a Russian research vessel, the Petr Kottsov, when the white color of this microbe caught their interest. They were actually looking for other recently found sulfide-eating marine bacteria, Thioploca and Beggiatoa. They ended up with an entire new discovery, of a much larger cousin strain of the two other bacteria. In 2005, a closely related strain was discovered in the Gulf of Mexico. Among other differences from the Namibian strain, the Mexican strain does not seem to divide along a single axis and accordingly does not form chains.

The previously largest known bacterium was Epulopiscium fishelsoni, at 0.5 mm long. Thiomargarita magnifica described in 2022 is larger.

Structure
Although Thiomargarita is closely related to Thioploca and Beggiatoa in function, their structures proved to be vastly different. Thioploca and Beggiatoa cells are much smaller and grow tightly stacked on each other in long filaments. Their shape is necessary for them to shuttle down into the ocean sediments to find more sulfide and nitrate. In contrast, Thiomargarita grow in rows of separate single ball-shaped cells, not allowing them to have the range of mobility that Thioploca and Beggiota have.

With their lack of movement, Thiomargarita have adapted by evolving very large nitrate-storing bubbles, called vacuoles, allowing them to survive long periods of nitrate and sulfide starvation. The vacuoles give them the ability to stay immobile, just waiting for nitrate-rich waters to sweep over them once again. These vacuoles are what account for the size that scientists had previously thought impossible. Scientists disregarded large bacterium, because bacteria rely on chemiosmosis across their membranes to make ATP, as the cells become larger, they make proportionately less ATP, thus energy production limits their size. Thiomargarita are an exception to this size constraint, as their cytoplasm forms along the periphery of the cell, while the nitrate-storing vacuoles occupy the center of the cell. As these vacuoles swell, they greatly contribute to the record-holding size. It holds the record for the world's largest bacteria, with a volume three million times more than that of the average bacteria.

Metabolism 
The bacterium is chemolithotrophic and is capable of using nitrate as the terminal electron acceptor in the electron transport chain. The organism will oxidize hydrogen sulfide (H2S) into elemental sulfur (S). This is deposited as granules in its periplasm and is highly refractile and opalescent, making the organism look like a pearl.

While the sulfide is available in the surrounding sediment, produced by other bacteria from dead microalgae that sank down to the sea bottom, the nitrate comes from the above seawater. Since the bacterium is sessile, and the concentration of available nitrate fluctuates considerably over time, it stores nitrate at high concentration (up to 0.8 molar) in a large vacuole like an inflated balloon, which is responsible for about 80% of its size. When nitrate concentrations in the environment are low, the bacterium uses the contents of its vacuole for respiration. Thus, the presence of a central vacuole in its cells enables a prolonged survival in sulfidic sediments. The non-motility of Thiomargarita cells is compensated by its large cellular size.

Recent research has also indicated that the bacterium may be facultatively anaerobic rather than obligately anaerobic, and thus capable of respiring with oxygen if it is plentiful.

Significance 
Gigantism is usually a disadvantage for bacteria. Bacteria obtain their nutrients via simple diffusion process across their cell membrane, as they lack the sophisticated nutrient uptake mechanism found in eukaryotes. A bacterium of large size would imply a lower ratio of cell membrane surface area to cell volume. This would limit the rate of uptake of nutrients to threshold levels. Large bacteria might starve easily unless they have a different backup mechanism. T. namibiensis overcomes this problem by harboring large vacuoles that can be filled up with life-supporting nitrates.

See also
 Valonia ventricosa - a large, 5 centimetre-wide unicellular species of algae

References

External links 
 Macrophotos of Thiomargarita namibiensis

Thiotrichales
Bacteria described in 1999